The men's marathon event at the 1938 British Empire Games was held on 7 February in Sydney, Australia with the start and finish at the Sydney Cricket Ground.

Results

References

Athletics at the 1938 British Empire Games
1938